AM Riasat Ali Biswas (1932-2016) was a Bangladesh Jamaat-e-Islami politician and the former Member of Parliament of Satkhira-3.

Career
Biswas was elected to parliament from Satkhira-3 as a Bangladesh Jamaat-e-Islami candidate in 1991 and 2001.

Death 
AM Riasat Ali Biswas died on 10 March 2016.

References

1932 births
2016 deaths
People from Satkhira District
Bangladesh Jamaat-e-Islami politicians
5th Jatiya Sangsad members
8th Jatiya Sangsad members